Neri Corsini may refer to:

 Neri Corsini (1614–1678), cardinal from 1664 onwards
 Neri Maria Corsini (1685–1770), nephew of Pope Clement XII, made cardinal by his uncle 1730
 Neri Corsini (died 1377), bishop of Fiesole from 1374 to 1377, see War of the Eight Saints
 Neri Corsini (fl. 1170), founder of the Corsini family
 Neri Corsini (1771–1845), Italian diplomat and politician 

Neri